Wolfgang J. Fuchs (16 September 1945 – 20 January 2020) was a German nonfiction author, journalist, comics scholar, comics author, comics translator and film expert. He co-wrote the first standard work in German on comics as an art form, published in 1971. He translated comics such as Prince Valiant, Garfield, and Mom's Cancer by Brian Fies. The translated book Mutter hat Krebs was awarded the 2007 Deutscher Jugendliteraturpreis.

Life 
Wolfgang J. Fuchs was born in Unsleben, Lower Franconia. He studied civil engineering for one semester and then switched to studying  (print media) with secondary topics American studies and English studies.

Fuchs was among the first German authors who took comics seriously. With , with whom he grew up and studied, he wrote standards such as Comics. Anatomie eines Massenmediums (Comics, anatomy of a mass medium, 1971) and Comics-Handbuch (Comics handbook, 1978). The 1971 book was the first standard work in German on comics as an art form. It was translated to several languages, and appeared in the United States. Fuchs participated in Maurice Horn's The World Encyclopedia of Comics, the Who's Who of American Comic Books, published by Jerry Bales/Hames Ware, in four volumes between 1973 and 1976. He worked for the Filmnotizbuch 1978/79, belonged to the staff of the Peanuts magazine in 1974/75, and wrote articles for radio and magazines.

Fuchs translated Prince Valiant (in German: Prinz Eisenherz) and Garfield, among others. He was involved in the  Disneys  series (2005–2009), and the  series (2004–2011), including volumes four and 13. He translated the autobiographical story Mom's Cancer by Brian Fies, which first appeared as a web comic. The translated book, Mutter hat Krebs, was awarded the 2007 Deutscher Jugendliteraturpreis.

He wrote the texts of Quark, with artist Günter Mayrhofer, which began in the fall of 1987 in print and television. Fuchs also wrote nonfiction books about German-American topics and about films, such as books about Humphrey Bogart, James Dean and Woody Allen.

Fuchs lived in Munich until his death on 20 January 2020.

Work 
Publications by Fuchs are held by the German National Library, including:
 with Reinhold C. Reitberger: Panel 1, München: Heinz Moos, (1971)
 with Reinhold C. Reitberger: Comics. Anatomie eines Massenmediums, Gräfelfing near Munich 1971 (with record), ; and further editions, also entitled Das große Buch der Comics. Anatomie eines Massenmediums
 Comics – harmlose Bildergeschichten (1974)
 as editor: Comics im Medienmarkt – in der Analyse – im Unterricht (VS Verlag für Sozialwissenschaften, 1977), 
 with Reinhold C. Reitberger: Comics-Handbuch, Reinbek bei Hamburg 1978 
 Die vielen Gesichter des Woody Allen, Taschen, 1988, 
 James Dean. Spuren eines Giganten, Taschen, 1988, 
 Humphrey Bogart. Kult- Star, Taschen, 1988, 
 Micky Maus – Das ist mein Leben, Unipart-Vlg., Remseck (Januar 1991), 

References

External links 

 
 Wolfgang J. Fuchs (list of publications of comics and books) Deutscher Comic-Guide
 Wolfgang J. Fuchs Lambiek Comiclopedia

German non-fiction writers
German journalists
German comics writers
Comics scholars
German translators
1945 births
2020 deaths
People from Rhön-Grabfeld